Portsmouth Abbey is a Benedictine monastery in Portsmouth, on Aquidneck Island in Narragansett Bay, Rhode Island, United States. The mission of the community is to seek God guided by the Gospel, the Rule of St. Benedict, and most importantly, prayer and work to sanctify themselves and their community. As of 2020, the abbey has 8 monks.

History and description
The monastery was founded in 1918 as Portsmouth Priory by Dom Leonard Sargent, an American monk of Downside Abbey in England. In keeping with the congregation’s early history, the monks run a college preparatory boarding school for boys and girls. The monks also focused on scholarly and artistic work, and hospitality, as well as helping local parishes.

The English Benedictine Congregation (EBC), of which Portsmouth Abbey is a member, is the oldest of the Benedictine congregations. It has canonical continuity with the first congregation established in the 13th century by the Holy See. The monks of the EBC run schools attached to their monasteries and look after 27 small parishes and mass centers near them. In addition, 30 parishes and 14 mass centers in England and Wales are served by EBC monks. A tradition revived by Fr Augustine Baker in the early 1600s laid great emphasis on contemplative and mystical prayer. This tradition continues in the EBC and at Portsmouth Abbey today.

Saint Benedict did not specify how monks should earn their living: he stipulated only that work be done in the spirit of corporate prayer and Christ-like love. With that guidance in mind, the Portsmouth Abbey monks maintain a school to generate income.

Portsmouth Abbey School has been operated continuously since it was founded in 1926. Its mission statement is based on reverence for God and the human person, respect for learning and order; and responsibility for the shared experience of community life.

The community and liturgical life of the monastery overflow into the school as a valuable contribution to society. For the monks themselves, the school provides work in a task that is fully human and that is not escapist from social obligations or fostering "a fugitive and cloistered virtue". From teaching and being responsible for the young, the monk can learn a unique form of selflessness which can be realized in the exercise of spiritual fatherhood.

Recruiting
Monks at Portsmouth Abbey have used the internet to drive recruitment. The monastery maintains a Facebook page, and features Frequently Asked Questions for would-be monks on their site.

References
Notes

Sources
Portsmouth Abbey website
Portsmouth Abbey School website
English Benedictine Congregation website: Portsmouth Abbey

External links

Benedictine monasteries in the United States
Buildings and structures in Portsmouth, Rhode Island